

Events

Pre-1600
 447 – A powerful earthquake destroys large portions of the Walls of Constantinople, including 57 towers.
 963 – Synod of Rome: Emperor Otto I calls a council at St. Peter's Basilica in Rome. Pope John XII is deposed on charges of an armed rebellion against Otto.
1217 – The Charter of the Forest is sealed at St Paul's Cathedral, London by King Henry III, acting under the regency of William Marshall, 1st Earl of Pembroke which re-establishes for free men rights of access to the royal forest that had been eroded by William the Conqueror and his heirs.

1601–1900
1792 – Battle of Jemappes in the French Revolutionary Wars.
1860 – Abraham Lincoln is elected the 16th president of the United States with only 40% of the popular vote, defeating John C. Breckinridge, John Bell, and Stephen A. Douglas in a four-way race.
1869 – In New Brunswick, New Jersey, Rutgers College defeats Princeton University (then known as the College of New Jersey), 6–4, in the first official intercollegiate American football game.
1900 – President William McKinley is re-elected, along with his vice-presidential running mate, Governor Theodore Roosevelt of New York. Republicans also swept the congressional elections, winning increased majorities in both the Senate and the House of Representatives.

1901–present
1936 – Spanish Civil War: The republican government flees from Madrid to Valencia, leading to the formation of the Madrid Defense Council in its stead.
1943 – World War II: The 1st Ukrainian Front liberates Kyiv from German occupation.
1947 – Meet the Press, the longest running television program in history, makes its debut on NBC Television.
1963 – Nguyễn Ngọc Thơ is appointed to head the South Vietnamese government by General Dương Văn Minh's junta, five days after the latter deposed and assassinated President Ngô Đình Diệm.
1971 – The United States Atomic Energy Commission tests the largest U.S. underground hydrogen bomb, code-named Cannikin, on Amchitka Island in the Aleutians.
1977 – The Kelly Barnes Dam, located above Toccoa Falls College near Toccoa, Georgia, fails, killing 39.
1985 – Colombian conflict, leftist guerrillas of the 19th of April Movement seize control of the Palace of Justice in Bogotá.
1986 – Sumburgh disaster: A British International Helicopters Boeing 234LR Chinook crashes 2 miles east of Sumburgh Airport killing 45 people. It is the deadliest civilian helicopter crash on record.
1988 – Lancang–Gengma earthquakes: At least 938 are killed after two powerful earthquakes rock the China–Myanmar border in Yunnan Province.
1995 – Cleveland Browns relocation controversy: Art Modell announces that he signed a deal that would relocate the Cleveland Browns to Baltimore.
2002 – Jiang Lijun is detained by Chinese police for signing the Open Letter to the 16th National Congress of the Chinese Communist Party.
  2002   – A Fokker 50 crashes near Luxembourg Airport, killing 20 and injuring three.
2004 – An express train collides with a stationary car near the village of Ufton Nervet, England, killing seven and injuring 150.
2012 – Tammy Baldwin becomes the first openly gay politician to be elected to the United States Senate.
2016 – Syrian civil war: The Syrian Democratic Forces (SDF) launch an offensive to capture the city of Raqqa from the Islamic State of Iraq and the Levant (ISIL).

Births

Pre-1600
1391 – Edmund Mortimer, 5th Earl of March, English politician (d. 1425)
1479 – Philip I, Margrave of Baden (d. 1533)
1494 – Suleiman the Magnificent, Sultan of the Ottoman Empire (d. 1566)
1550 – Karin Månsdotter, Swedish queen (d. 1612)

1601–1900
1604 – George Ent, English scientist (d. 1689)
1661 – Charles II of Spain, last Habsburg ruler of the Spanish Empire (d. 1700)
1750 – Carlo Aurelio Widmann, Venetian nobleman and admiral (d. 1798)
1814 – Adolphe Sax, Belgian-French instrument designer, invented the saxophone (d. 1894)
1841 – Nelson W. Aldrich, American businessman and politician (d. 1915)
1851 – Charles Dow, American journalist and economist (d. 1902)
1854 – John Philip Sousa, American composer and bandleader (d. 1932)
1861 – James Naismith, Canadian-American physician and educator, invented basketball (d. 1939)
1880 – Yoshisuke Aikawa, Japanese businessman and politician, founded Nissan Motor Company (d. 1967)
1884 – May Brahe, Australian composer (d. 1956)
1885 – Martin O'Meara, Irish-Australian sergeant, Victoria Cross recipient (d. 1935)
1887 – Walter Johnson, American baseball player and manager (d. 1946)
1897 – Jack O'Connor, English cricketer (d. 1977)
1900 – Ida Lou Anderson, American orator and professor, pioneer in the field of radio broadcasting (d. 1941)

1901–present
1908 – Tony Canzoneri, American boxer (d. 1959)
1913 – Cho Ki-chon, North Korean poet (d. 1951)
1921 – Geoff Rabone, New Zealand cricketer (d. 2006)
1924 – Harry Threadgold, English footballer (d. 1996)
1926 – Frank Carson, Northern Irish comedian and actor (d. 2012)
  1926   – Zig Ziglar, American soldier, businessman, and author (d. 2012)
1930 – Derrick Bell, American scholar, author and critical race theorist (d. 2011)
1931 – Mike Nichols, German-born American actor, director, producer, and screenwriter (d. 2014)
1932 – François Englert, Belgian physicist and academic, Nobel Prize laureate
1933 – Else Ackermann, German physician and pharmacologist (d. 2019)
1937 – Leo Goeke, American tenor and actor (d. 2012)
1938 – Mack Jones, American baseball player (d. 2004)
1939 – Michael Schwerner, American activist (d. 1964)
  1939   – Leonardo Quisumbing, Filipino lawyer and jurist (d. 2019)
1940 – Johnny Giles, Irish footballer and manager
1941 – Guy Clark, American singer-songwriter, guitarist, and producer (d. 2016) 
  1941   – Doug Sahm, American singer-songwriter and musician (d. 1999)
1946 – Sally Field, American actress
  1946   – George Young, Scottish guitarist, songwriter, and producer (d. 2017)
1948 – Glenn Frey, American singer-songwriter, guitarist, and actor (d. 2016)
1950 – Nimalan Soundaranayagam, Sri Lankan educator and politician (d. 2000)
  1950   – Shaikh Rasheed Ahmad, Pakistani politician
1952 – Michael Cunningham, American novelist and screenwriter
1953 – Frank Hanisch, German footballer
  1953   – Brian McKechnie, New Zealand cricketer and rugby player
1955 – Mark Donaldson, New Zealand rugby player
  1955   – Maria Shriver, American journalist and author
1956 – Graeme Wood, Australian cricketer and footballer
1960 – Lance Kerwin, American actor (d. 2023)
1962 – Nadezhda Kuzhelnaya, Russian pilot and former cosmonaut
1963 – Rozz Williams, American singer, musician and artist (d. 1998)
1964 – Mike Brewer, New Zealand rugby player
1966 – Stephanie Vozzo, American professional comic book colorist and music agent
1967 – Shuzo Matsuoka, Japanese tennis player and sportscaster
1968 – Kelly Rutherford, American actress
  1968   – Jerry Yang, Taiwanese-American engineer and businessman, co-founded Yahoo!
1971 – Laura Flessel-Colovic, French fencer and politician
1972 – Rebecca Romijn, American model and actress
1973 – David Giffin, Australian rugby player
1974 – Frank Vandenbroucke, Belgian cyclist (d. 2009)
1978 – Erik Cole, American ice hockey player
  1978   – Zak Morioka, Brazilian race car driver
1979 – Adam LaRoche, American baseball player
  1979   – Lamar Odom, American basketball player
  1979   – Brad Stuart, Canadian ice hockey player
1981 – Kaspars Gorkšs, Latvian footballer
  1981   – Andrew Murray, Canadian ice hockey player
1983 – Nicole Hosp, Austrian skier
1984 – Ricky Romero, American baseball player
  1984   – Sebastian Schachten, German footballer
1986 – Ben Rector, American singer, songwriter and musician
  1986   – Conor Sammon, Irish footballer
1987 – Ana Ivanovic, Serbian tennis player
  1987   – Naoki Miyata, Japanese footballer
1988 – Erik Lund, Swedish footballer
  1988   – Emma Stone, American actress
  1988   – Conchita Wurst, Austrian singer
1989 – Jozy Altidore, American soccer player
  1989   – Aaron Hernandez, American football player (d. 2017)
1990 – André Schürrle, German footballer
  1990   – Akua Shōma, Japanese sumo wrestler
  1990   – Bowen Yang, Australian-born American actor, comedian, podcaster, and writer
  1992 – Rebecca Allen, Australian basketball player
  1992   – Nasya Dimitrova, Bulgarian volleyball player
1992   – Paula Kania, Polish tennis player
  1992   – Kim Ah-young, South Korean singer and actress
1993 – Josh Wakefield, English footballer
1994 – Isaah Yeo, Australian rugby league player
1995 – Addin Fonua-Blake, Australian-Tongan rugby league player
1997 – Aliona Bolsova, Spanish-Moldovan tennis player
  1997   – Elena-Gabriela Ruse, Romanian tennis player
  1997   – Hero Fiennes-Tiffin, English actor and model
2001 – Day'Ron Sharpe, American basketball player

Deaths

Pre-1600
1003 – Pope John XVII
1312 – Christina von Stommeln, Roman Catholic mystic and stigmatic (b. 1242)
1406 – Pope Innocent VII (b. 1339)
1492 – Antoine Busnois, French composer and poet (b. 1430)

1601–1900
1656 – Jean-Baptiste Morin, French mathematician, astrologer, and astronomer (b. 1583)
1672 – Heinrich Schütz, German organist and composer (b. 1585)
1692 – Gédéon Tallemant des Réaux, French author and poet (b. 1619)
1752 – Ralph Erskine, Scottish minister (b. 1685)
1816 – Gouverneur Morris, American scholar, politician, and diplomat, United States Ambassador to France (b. 1752)
1893 – Pyotr Ilyich Tchaikovsky, Russian Composer (b. 1840)

1901–present
1918 – Alan Arnett McLeod, Canadian lieutenant, Victoria Cross recipient (b. 1899)
1942 – Emil Starkenstein, Czech pharmacologist and academic (b. 1884)
1955 – Edwin Barclay, 18th president of Liberia (b. 1882)
1964 – Hugo Koblet, Swiss cyclist (b. 1925)
1965 – Clarence Williams, American singer-songwriter, pianist, and producer (b. 1898)
1968 – Chauncey Sparks, American politician and 41st Governor of Alabama (b. 1884)
1978 – Heiri Suter, Swiss cyclist (b. 1899)
1984 – Gastón Suárez, Bolivian author and playwright (b. 1929)
1985 – Sanjeev Kumar, Indian film actor (b. 1938)
1987 – Zohar Argov, Israeli singer (b. 1955)
1991 – Gene Tierney, American actress (b. 1920)
1998 – Sky Low Low, Canadian wrestler (b. 1928)
2000 – L. Sprague de Camp, American historian and author (b. 1907)
2003 – Just Betzer, Danish production manager and producer (b. 1944)
  2003   – Rie Mastenbroek, Dutch swimmer and coach (b. 1919)
2004 – Johnny Warren, Australian footballer, manager, and sportscaster (b. 1943)
2005 – Rod Donald, New Zealand lawyer and politician (b. 1957) 
  2005   – Anthony Sawoniuk, Belarusian SS officer (b. 1921)
2006 – Francisco Fernández Ochoa, Spanish skier (b. 1950)
  2006   – Federico López, Mexican-Puerto Rican basketball player (b. 1962)
2007 – Hilda Braid, English actress and singer (b. 1929)
  2007   – George Grljusich, Australian footballer and sportscaster (b. 1939)
  2007   – Hank Thompson, American singer-songwriter and guitarist (b. 1925)
2009 – Ron Sproat, American screenwriter and playwright (b. 1932)
2010 – Robert Lipshutz, American soldier and lawyer, 17th White House Counsel (b. 1921)
2012 – Joel Connable, American journalist and actor (b. 1973)
  2012   – Clive Dunn, English actor (b. 1920) 
  2012   – Frank J. Prial, American journalist and author (b. 1930)
2013 – Tarla Dalal, Indian chef and author (b. 1936)
  2013   – Ace Parker, American football and baseball player (b. 1912)
2014 – Maggie Boyle, English singer and flute player (b. 1956)
  2014   – Tommy Macpherson, Scottish soldier and businessman (b. 1920) 
  2014   – Rick Rosas, American bass player (b. 1949)
2015 – Bobby Campbell, English footballer and manager (b. 1937)
  2015   – Yitzhak Navon, Israeli author, playwright, and politician, 5th President of Israel (b. 1921) 
2017 – Richard F. Gordon Jr., American naval officer, aviator, test pilot, and NASA astronaut (b. 1929)
2018 – Bernard Landry, Canadian lawyer, politician and Premier of Quebec (b. 1937)
2020 – Ken Spears, American writer (b. 1938)

Holidays and observances
Christian feast day:
Barlaam of Khutyn
Demetrian 
Illtud
Leonard of Noblac
Melaine of Rennes
Winnoc
November 6 (Eastern Orthodox liturgics)
Gustavus Adolphus Day (in Sweden, Finland and Estonia)
Finnish Swedish Heritage Day (in Finland)
International Day for Preventing the Exploitation of the Environment in War and Armed Conflict

References

External links

 
 
 

Days of the year
November